Matheus Pereira may refer to:

 Matheus Pereira (footballer, born 1996), Brazilian football attacking midfielder for Al Hilal
 Matheus Pereira (footballer, born 1997), Brazilian football midfielder for Oita Trinita
 Matheus Pereira (footballer, born 1998), Brazilian football attacking midfielder for Eibar
 Matheus Pereira (footballer, born 2000), Brazilian football left-back for Vizela